Danilo Petrović may refer to:

 Danilo I, Metropolitan of Cetinje, Metropolitan of Cetinje, in office (1697-1735)
 Danilo I, Prince of Montenegro, ruling Prince of Montenegro (1851–1860)
 Danilo, Crown Prince of Montenegro, Crown Prince of Montenegro (b. 1871 - d. 1939)
 Danilo Petrović (tennis), Serbian tennis player
 Danilo Petrović (basketball), Serbian basketball player

See also
 Petrović (surname)